Dolný Ohaj is a municipality and village in the Nové Zámky District in the Nitra Region of south-west Slovakia.

History
In historical records the village was first mentioned in 1293.

Geography
The village lies at an altitude of 124 metres and covers an area of 17.928 km². It has a population of about 1720 people.

Ethnicity
The population is about 98% Slovak.

Facilities
The village has a public library.

Genealogical resources
The records for genealogical research are available at the state archive "Statny Archiv in Nitra, Slovakia"

 Roman Catholic church records (births/marriages/deaths): 1787-1895 (parish A)
 Reformated church records (births/marriages/deaths): 1785-1951 (parish B)

See also
 List of municipalities and towns in Slovakia

External links
 
 
https://web.archive.org/web/20071116010355/http://www.statistics.sk/mosmis/eng/run.html
 Dolný Ohaj – Nové Zámky okolie

Villages and municipalities in Nové Zámky District